The 1952 Nevada Wolf Pack football team represented the University of Nevada as an independent during the 1952 college football season. Led by first-year head coach Jake Lawlor, the Wolf Pack compiled a record of 2–2, scoring 105 points and allowing 107 in an abbreviated four-game schedule. Neil Garrett and Ray Gonsalves served as team co-captains. Senior end Mert Baxter led the team in scoring with 25 points. Nevada did not field a team in 1951.

Schedule

References

Nevada
Nevada Wolf Pack football seasons
Nevada Wolf Pack football